Luconia may refer to:

 An alternative name for Thiallela, a genus of moths 
 A historic name for the Philippine island of Luzon
 The Luconia Shoals, a reef complex off the north coast of Borneo

For similar names, see
 Laconia (disambiguation)
 Lucania (disambiguation)